Laurel Canyon, Los Angeles is an area in the Hollywood Hills of California.

 Laurel Canyon Boulevard, a street that passes through Laurel Canyon in California
 Laurel Canyon station, a station in the Metro Busway system, Los Angeles, California
 Laurel Canyon station (Metro Rail), a planned station in the Metro Rail system, Arleta, California

Laurel Canyon may also refer to:

Film and TV
 Laurel Canyon (film), a 2002 American drama movie
 Laurel Canyon (documentary), a 2020 documentary by Amblin Television

Music
 Laurel Canyon, a 1968 album by Jackie DeShannon
 Blues from Laurel Canyon, a 1968 album by John Mayall

Songs
"Laurel Canyon", song written and sung by Jackie DeShannon 1968
"Laurel Canyon", written and sung by Wayne Carson, covered by Benny Mahan 1970
"Laurel Canyon", song by Le Orme from List of songs about Los Angeles
"Laurel Canyon", song by Soho (band) from List of songs about Los Angeles
"Laurel Canyon", song by Game Theory from Supercalifragile, written Scott Miller 
"Laurel Canyon", song by Sam Smith from Love Goes
"Laurel Canyon", song by The Church from Further/Deeper
"Laurel Canyon Blvd" by Van Dyke Parks
"Laurel Canyon Home" by John Mayall
"Laurel Canyon Sky Song" by Larry McNeely

See also